Joseph Edmund Morgan (7 August 1945 – 22 December 2002) was a New Zealand rugby union player. A second five-eighth, Morgan represented North Auckland at a provincial level, playing a record 165 matches for that union. He was a member of the New Zealand national side, the All Blacks, from 1974 to 1976, and appeared in 22 matches for the All Blacks including five internationals.

References

1945 births
2002 deaths
Rugby union players from Whangārei
New Zealand rugby union players
New Zealand international rugby union players
Northland rugby union players
Rugby union centres
People educated at Whangarei Boys' High School